Amta Assembly constituency is an assembly constituency in Howrah district in the Indian state of West Bengal.

Overview
As per orders of the Delimitation Commission, No. 181 Amta Assembly constituency  is composed of the following: Amta II community development block, and Bainan, Baksirhat, Kalyanpur and Sabsit gram panchayats of Bagnan I community development block.
|
Amta Assembly constituency is part of No. 26 Uluberia (Lok Sabha constituency).

Members of Legislative Assembly

Election results

1951–1972
Aftabuddin Mondal of Congress won in 1972. Barindranath Koley of CPI(M) won in 1971. Nitai Bhandari of CPI(M) won in 1969 and 1967. Tarapada Pramanick of Congress won in 1962. In 1957 Amta had two seats. Gobinda Charan Maji of PSP won the Amta East seat. Arabinda Roy of Congress won the Amta West seat. In 1951 Amta had three seats. Arabinda Roy of Congress won the Amta South seat. Tarapada Pramanick of Congress won the Amta Central seat. Alamohan Das, Independent, won the Amta North seat.

1977–2006
In 2006, 2001 and 1996 state assembly elections Pratyush Mukherjee of CPI(M)  won the Amta assembly seat defeating his nearest rivals Ashok Maji of Trinamool Congress in 2006 and 2001, and Prasun Bakuly of Congress in 1996. Contests in most years were multi cornered but only winners and runners are being mentioned. Barindranath Koley of CPI(M) defeated Aftabuddin Mondal of Congress in 1991 and 1987, Ainuddin Sk. of Congress in 1982, and Aftabuddin Mondal of Congress in 1977.

2011
In the 2011 election, Asit Mitra of Congress defeated his nearest rival Rabindra Nath Mitra of CPI(M).

 

.# Swing calculated on Congress+Trinamool Congress vote percentages taken together in 2006.

2016
In the 2016 election, Asit Mitra of Indian National Congress defeated his nearest rival Tushar Kanti Sil of Trinamool Congress.

2021
In the 2021 election, Sukanta Kumar Paul of Trinamool Congress defeated his nearest rival Debtanu Bhattacharjee of Bharatiya Janata Party.

References

Assembly constituencies of West Bengal
Politics of Howrah district